The 2010 EHF European Men's Handball Championship (9th tournament) was held in Austria from 19 to 31 January, in the cities of Vienna, Graz, Innsbruck, Linz and Wiener Neustadt.

Venues
5 Austrian cities have been selected to host the 2010 Championship. The venues in Linz, Graz and Wiener Neustadt were only used during the preliminary round. The fourth venue to be used in this round was located in Innsbruck, and was also one of the two venues in the main round. The other being Wiener Stadthalle in Vienna, which was the only venue to be used in the final round.

Qualification

Qualification matches were played in 2008 and in 2009. For the first time, in qualification round all teams are included, except host Austria and defending champion Denmark. Teams were divided in 7 groups and top two teams from each group qualified to European Championship.

Qualified teams

1 Bold indicates champion for that year
2 Between 1996 and 2006, Serbia participated as FR Yugoslavia and Serbia and Montenegro.

Seeding
The draw for the final tournament took place 19:00 CET on 24 June 2009 at the Liechtenstein Museum in Vienna.

Squads

Group A
 (squad)
 (squad)
 (squad)
 (squad)

Group B
 (squad)
 (squad)
 (squad)
 (squad)

Group C
 (squad)
 (squad)
 (squad)
 (squad)

Group D
 (squad)
 (squad)
 (squad)
 (squad)

Preliminary round
In the following tables:
Pld = total games played
W = total games won
D = total games drawn (tied)
L = total games lost
GF = total goals scored (goals for)
GA = total goals conceded (goals against)
GD = goal difference (GF−GA)
Pts = total points accumulated

The teams placed first, second and third (shaded in green) qualified to the main round.

Group A
Venue: Stadthalle, Graz

All times are Central European Time (UTC+1)

Group B
Venue: Intersport Arena, Linz

All times are Central European Time (UTC+1)

Group C
Venue: Olympiaworld, Innsbruck

All times are Central European Time (UTC+1)

Group D
Venue: Arena Nova, Wiener Neustadt

All times are Central European Time (UTC+1)

Main round

Group I
Venue: Stadthalle, Vienna

Group II
Venue: Olympiaworld, Innsbruck

Final round
Venue: Stadthalle, Vienna

5th/6th place

Semifinals

Bronze-medal game

Final

Ranking and statistics

Final ranking

All Star Team
Goalkeeper: 
Left Wing: 
Left Back: 
Playmaker: 
Pivot: 
Right Back: 
Right Wing:

Other awards
Best Defence Player : 
Most Valuable Player: 
Source: ehf-euro.com

Top goalkeepers

Source: EHF

Top goalscorers

Source: EHF

EHF Broadcasting rights

See also

 2010 European Women's Handball Championship

References

External links

 
2010
European men championship
2010 in Austrian sport
International handball competitions hosted by Austria
January 2010 sports events in Europe
2010s in Vienna
Sports competitions in Vienna
Sports competitions in Innsbruck
2010s in Innsbruck
Sport in Graz
Sports competitions in Linz
Wiener Neustadt